Say It Live and Loud: Live in Dallas 08.26.68 is a live album by James Brown released in 1998. Taped at Dallas Memorial Auditorium soon after "Say It Loud – I'm Black and I'm Proud" had been released to the airwaves, it includes one of the only live recordings of the song, with the arena crowd shouting the call and response portions. Village Voice critic Robert Christgau deemed it the second best live recording from Brown's "crucial" 1967–71 period, behind 1970's Sex Machine. Following the 50th anniversary of the recording, the entire performance, including never before released live performances of "That's Life" and "The Popcorn", was released on vinyl by Republic Records on October 12, 2018.

Track listing
 Show Introduction – 0:37
 "If I Ruled the World" (Leslie Bricusse, Cyril Ornadel) – 3:45
 James Brown Thanks – 0:49
 "Say It Loud (I'm Black and I'm Proud)" (Introduction) – 1:33
 "Say It Loud (I'm Black and I'm Proud)" (James Brown, Pee Wee Ellis) – 3:08
 "I Guess I'll Have to Cry, Cry, Cry" (James Brown) – 4:19
 "Kansas City" (Jerry Leiber, Mike Stoller) – 4:13
 "Suds" (Nat Kendrick) – 5:16
 "Soul Pride" (James Brown, Pee Wee Ellis) – 3:01
 "Tighten Up" (Archie Bell, Billy Buttier) – 7:11
 Introduction to Star Time! – 0:42
 "Licking Stick-Licking Stick" (James Brown, Bobby Byrd, Pee Wee Ellis) – 4:13
 "Cold Sweat" (James Brown, Pee Wee Ellis) – 12:51
 "There Was a Time" (James Brown, Bud Hobgood) – 4:57
 Medley: "Try Me"/"Lost Someone"/"Bewildered" (James Brown, Bobby Byrd, Teddy Powell, Lloyd Stallworth, Leonard Whitcup) – 6:14
 "Papa's Got a Brand New Bag" (James Brown) – 0:30
 "I Got the Feelin'" (James Brown) – 2:43
 "Maybe the Last Time" (James Brown) – 1:13
 "I Got You (I Feel Good)" (James Brown) – 0:27
 "Please, Please, Please" (James Brown, Johnny Terry) – 2:15
 "I Can't Stand Myself (When You Touch Me)" (James Brown) – 3:09
 "Cold Sweat" (Reprise) (James Brown, Pee Wee Ellis) – 0:46 
 "I Got the Feelin'" (Reprise) (James Brown) – 0:27 
 "Say It Loud (I'm Black and I'm Proud)" (Reprise) (James Brown, Pee Wee Ellis) – 1:51

Personnel
 James Brown – vocals
 Richard "Kush" Griffith – trumpet
 Waymon Reed – trumpet
 Levi Rasbury – valve trombone
 Fred Wesley – trombone
 Maceo Parker – tenor sax, emcee
 Alfred "Pee Wee" Ellis – bandleader, alto saxophone, organ
 St. Clair Pinckney – tenor and baritone sax, duet voice on "Licking Stick-Licking Stick"
 Jimmy Nolen – guitar
 Alphonso "Country" Kellum – bass guitar
 Sweet Charles Sherrell – bass on "I Can't Stand Myself"
 Clyde Stubblefield – drums
 Nate Jones – drums
 Richard Jones – violin
Marilyn Jones – violin
Sylvia Medford – violin

References

James Brown live albums
1998 live albums
Polydor Records live albums
Albums produced by James Brown